Tallulah is the fifth album by The Go-Betweens. It was released in May 1987 in the UK on Beggars Banquet Records. Prior to the recording of the album, the group had expanded to a five-piece with the addition of multi-instrumentalist Amanda Brown. The original release consisted of ten songs. In 2004, LO-MAX Records released an expanded CD which included a second disc of ten bonus tracks and music videos for the songs, "Right Here" and "Bye Bye Pride".

Recording
Initial recording was done with Craig Leon in an attempt to make more commercial music. Only two tracks, both featuring synthesisers and drum machines, were ever completed, including the single "Right Here". Robert Forster later wrote that the band were "playing day after day, getting tighter and tighter, believing at least two of us would be playing on the recordings at the same time. Why did we bother? We arrived on the first day of the session to find Craig behind a bank of keyboards filling the control room, programming the drums, bass and organ lines."

With much of the recording budget spent on two songs, the remaining sessions with a new producer were hurried and the band was unhappy with the initial results. Forster said, "We were sort of cursed. We had the engineer that we were using on Liberty Belle, Dicky Preston, and working with Dicky was good. We then went on to the next one and we were put into this horrible studio it was over a practice room or something. And so Dicky didn't do a good job I think on Tallulah, so it had to be rescued and remixing a little but which always sounds horrible but it actually worked out okay with Mark Wallis."

On the addition of Amanda Brown, Forster said, "with a violin and oboe player in the band, it meant we sounded like no one else. Which is always a good thing. On Tallulah she broadened our sound, and gave it more drama, which the songs needed."

Reception

Robert Christgau said, "They stick to what they know, and their knowledge increases. The quartet's a quintet now, up one violin, which may not seem like much but does serve to reinforce the hooks that have never been a strength of their understated, ever more explicit tales from the bourgeois fringe. I soon got involved with every song on the album."

Thom Jurek of AllMusic found that "despite its production it has aged exceptionally well although it remains a product firmly of its time. The raw emotion, vulnerable tenderness and romantic desperation in its songs, textured by the blend of strings and keyboards, adds depth and dimension to this well of fine songs."

Track listing

Personnel
The Go-Betweens
 Amanda Brown – violin, oboe, guitar, keyboards, vocals
 Robert Forster – vocals, rhythm guitar
 Grant McLennan – vocals, lead guitar, piano
 Lindy Morrison – drums
 Robert Vickers – bass guitar
Additional musicians
 Audrey Riley – cello
 El Tito – Flamenco guitar
 Simon Fisher-Turner – backing vocals
 Colin Lloyd-Tucker – backing vocals

Production
 Photography – Peter Anderson
 Producer – Craig Leon on "Right Here and "Cut It Out"
 Producer – Richard Preston

References

The Go-Betweens albums
1987 albums
Beggars Banquet Records albums